Glyphipterix deuterastis is a species of sedge moths in the genus Glyphipterix. It was described by Edward Meyrick in 1907. It is found in Western Australia.

References

Moths described in 1907
Glyphipterigidae
Moths of Australia